Accent on Youth is a 1935 American comedy film directed by Wesley Ruggles and written by Herbert Fields and Claude Binyon based on the 1934 play of the same name  written by Samson Raphaelson. The film stars Sylvia Sidney and Herbert Marshall and features Phillip Reed, Holmes Herbert, Catherine Doucet, Astrid Allwyn and Lon Chaney Jr. The film was released on August 23, 1935, by Paramount Pictures.

Plot

Cast 
Sylvia Sidney as Linda Brown
Herbert Marshall as Steven Gaye
Phillip Reed as Dickie Reynolds
Holmes Herbert as Frank Galloway
Catherine Doucet as Miss Eleanor Darling 
Astrid Allwyn as Genevieve Lang 
Ernest Cossart as Flogdell
Lon Chaney, Jr. as Chuck
Dick Foran as Butch

Reception
Andre Sennwald of The New York Times said, "Samson Raphaelson's pleasant little stage comedy of middle-aged love spends a good deal of its time being a garrulous bore in its motion picture version at the Paramount Theatre. Never notable for any startling excesses of invention, it slows down to a succession of dialogues as it reaches the screen, and is content to be a faithful photographic study of its original. It is still a mild delight, though, to contemplate the fresh and amusing point of view which is the basis of Accent on Youth. Mr. Raphaelson has written a comedy which might serve as a sort of amorous supplement to Walter Pitkin's hymn of encouragement to the middle-aged. He performs a definite service for the emotional bankrupt, even if he does not call it "Love Begins at Fifty."

Writing for The Spectator in 1935, Graham Greene described the film as a "dreary comedy", and characterized the acting of Marshall as the "usual canine performance of dumb suffering". Greene noted that there was one good scene toward the end of the film, but advised readers not to wait for it.

References

External links 
 

1935 films
American black-and-white films
American films based on plays
1930s English-language films
Paramount Pictures films
American comedy films
1935 comedy films
Films directed by Wesley Ruggles
1930s American films